Rebin Gharib Sulaka Adhamat (born 12 April 1992) is an Iraqi professional footballer who plays as a centre back for Buriram United and the Iraq national team.

Club career
Sulaka started playing football in Eskilstuna City FK, where he as a 15-year-old made his debut in the first team. After the 2012 season, he did not renew the contract with the club. For the 2013 season he signed for Dalkurd FF. In January 2014 he signed a three-year contract with Ljungskile SK. In February 2015 wrote Sulaka on for Syrianska FC. In August 2015, he was loaned out to AFC United.

Elverum
Sulaka signed for Norwegian club Elverum for the 2016 season. After a successful season that ended in promotion to the second tier, he extended his contract for the 2017 season. He left the club mid-season and moved to Qatar.

Al-Markhiya
On 9 July 2017, Sulaka signed for Qatari club Al-Markhiya. He made his debut on 16 September, playing the full 90 minutes in a shock victory against giants Al-Sadd. He was picked in the team of the week for his performance.

Radnički Niš
Recently arrived at Radnički Niš, coach Milorad Kosanović expressed to the club management Sulaka to be his main desire to reinforce the defense, so the Serbian club signed him on August 30, 2019, a day before the closing of the transfer-window in Serbia and most of Europe.

Levski Sofia
In January 2021 Sulaka signed a six-month deal with Levski Sofia. In the spring of 2021 he left the club, which was experiencing financial troubles.

International career
On 12 June 2015, Rebin played his first game for the Iraq national team against Japan in Yokohama, the match ended in a 4–0 defeat. Rebin was present in the final rounds of Iraq's 2018 world cup qualifying campaign, in which Iraq failed to qualify to the world cup. In 2019, he was chosen in the Iraqi squad for the 2019 AFC Asian Cup.

On 20 February 2022, Rebin announced his retirement from international football for personal reasons.

Personal life
Sulaka was born in the suburb of Ankawa in Erbil, Iraq into an ethnic Assyrian family. In 2002, at the age of 10, Sulaka moved to Sweden with his family.

Honours
Buriram United
 Thai League 1: 2021–22
 Thai FA Cup: 2021–22
 Thai League Cup: 2021–22

References

External links
 
 

1992 births
Living people
Iraqi footballers
Iraq international footballers
People from Kirkuk
Iraqi emigrants to Sweden
Association football central defenders
Chaldean Catholics
Dalkurd FF players
Ljungskile SK players
Syrianska FC players
AFC Eskilstuna players
Eskilstuna City FK players
Elverum Fotball players
Al-Markhiya SC players
Al-Khor SC players
Al-Shahania SC players
FK Radnički Niš players
FC Arda Kardzhali players
Qatar Stars League players
Allsvenskan players
First Professional Football League (Bulgaria) players
2019 AFC Asian Cup players
Expatriate footballers in Norway
Expatriate footballers in Qatar
Expatriate footballers in Serbia
Expatriate footballers in Bulgaria